Jeff Jackson (born April 24, 1965) is a Canadian retired professional ice hockey winger and who played 263 games in the National Hockey League. He played for the Toronto Maple Leafs, New York Rangers, Quebec Nordiques, and Chicago Blackhawks.

Early life 
Jackson was born in Chatham-Kent, Ontario, and raised in Dresden, Ontario. After retirement in 1993, Jackson attended the University of Western Ontario Faculty of Law.

Career 
Prior to playing in the NHL, he played for Canada's World Junior Under-20 team which won a gold medal at the 1985 World Junior Ice Hockey Championships in Helsinki, Finland.

Upon graduating from law school, he accepted a position at Heenan Blaikie Law firm, where he practised sports and entertainment law. In June 2006, he was hired by the Toronto Maple Leafs as their director of hockey administration. On August 24, 2007, Jackson was promoted to assistant general manager and director of hockey operations, working alongside then general manager John Ferguson Jr. When Ferguson was fired on January 22, 2008, Jackson remained as the team's assistant general manager under Cliff Fletcher. On September 12, 2008, Jackson was appointed the new general manager and governor of the Toronto Marlies, the American Hockey League farm club of the Maple Leafs. He also maintained his role as assistant GM and director of hockey operations. In March 2010, months after Brian Burke became the team's GM and president, Jackson left his position with the Leafs.

Jackson has appeared as a guest speaker and lecturer at numerous universities and conferences, including Harvard Law School and Osgood Hall law school.

Career statistics

References

External links 

1965 births
Living people
Brantford Alexanders players
Canadian Christians
Canadian ice hockey left wingers
Chicago Blackhawks players
Halifax Citadels players
Hamilton Steelhawks players
Indianapolis Ice players
New Haven Nighthawks players
New York Rangers players
Newmarket Saints players
Quebec Nordiques players
St. Catharines Saints players
Toronto Maple Leafs draft picks
Toronto Maple Leafs executives
Toronto Maple Leafs players
University of Western Ontario alumni
Ice hockey people from Ontario
Sportspeople from Chatham-Kent